Hainan Li-Miao Autonomous Prefecture (1952–1988) was an autonomous prefecture in Guangdong Province, People's Republic of China. It was located on Hainan Island. The area now belongs to Hainan Province which was created in 1988.

See also
 Baoting Li and Miao Autonomous County
 Qiongzhong Li and Miao Autonomous County

Former prefectures in Hainan
Former autonomous prefectures of the People's Republic of China
1952 establishments in China